The Calico & Odessa Railroad is a  narrow gauge heritage railroad in the ghost town of Calico, California, headquartered in Yermo, California. It was named for the town and mountain range of Calico and the nearby Odessa Canyon.

It is a remake of the  narrow gauge Waterloo Mining Railroad, the original narrow gauge railroad line that hauled silver ore (and later borax) from Calico to the mills of Daggett in the 1880s, although the present-day tracks do not follow the trackbed of the original one.

The railroad, like Calico itself, is now operated as a San Bernardino county historic park. Visitors to the park may take a short ride on the railroad for a fee.

See also

List of heritage railroads in the United States

References

External links
Calico Ghost Town - official website
Extensive history of Calico, pics of the Railroad
Website regarding the Railroad

Heritage railroads in California
Mojave Desert
Transportation in San Bernardino County, California
Tourist attractions in San Bernardino County, California
California railroads
2 ft 6 in gauge railways in the United States